North Macedonia's ice hockey team (Hokejarska reprezentacija na Makedonija) is the national men's ice hockey team of North Macedonia. They are controlled by the Macedonian Ice Hockey Federation and has been an associate member of the International Ice Hockey Federation (IIHF) since 4 October 2001.

History
Macedonia played its first unofficial game on 27 March 2011 against Red Star Sofia of Bulgaria in Skopje. They went on to lose the game 4–1. On 20 December 2014, Macedonia played two exhibition games against the Bulgarian U20 national team in Skopje. They lost the first game 6–5 in overtime and won the second game 4–3 following a shootout, recording the team's first ever win. Macedonia have still never entered in any IIHF World Championship tournaments. On 20 January 2018, Macedonia made its international debut and played two exhibition games against Bosnia and Herzegovina in Sarajevo over the weekend. They won the first game 8–7 and lost the second game 7–6 in overtime a day later.

Team Image

Skopje Ice Skating Stadium
Its an outdoor Ice skating rink with two stands with capacity of 5000 spectators. It was built in 1969 for Ice Hockey World Cup Division C. Ice Hockey Clubs based in Skopje used the Stadium as a home ground . Ice skating schools were held at the venueand its used for recreational purposes. Recently there are plans for covering the stadium and transforming it in to an indoor arena.

Jerseys

Colors
National kit colors are colors of the flag which are also Spread on the Presidential Shield. Noble Red blood and Golden Yellow Sun Devine "ILI".

Tournament record

European Championship
Within , federal team 
1939-(11),1964-(11),1968-(7)
 after 1991 Didn't Held

Olympic Games
Within , federal team
1964-(14),1968-(9),1972-(11),1976-(10),1980-p,o(3rd),1984-(11),1988-p,o(5th)
 1996-2022 Didn't Enter

World Championships

Development Cup

All-time record against other nations
Last match update: 21 November 2018

All-time record against other clubs
Last match update: 21 December 2014

References

External links
 IIHF profile
 National Teams of Ice Hockey profile

2011 establishments in the Republic of Macedonia
Ice hockey in North Macedonia
National ice hockey teams in Europe
Ice hockey